Alexei Vladimirovich Tikhonov (born 1 November 1971) is a Russian pair skater. With partner Maria Petrova, he is the 2000 World champion and a two-time (1999, 2000) European champion.

Career 
Tikhonov began skating in his hometown, Samara. Initially a singles skater, he switched to pairs at 15 and a half.

Tikhonov first competed with partner Irina Saifutdinova for the Soviet Union and, after the dissolution, for Russia. They won the bronze medal at the 1989 World Junior Figure Skating Championships for the Soviet Union. Their partnership ended when she decided to get married and leave the sport.

He teamed up with Japanese pair skater Yukiko Kawasaki and competed with her representing Japan. Kawasaki and Tikhonov were two-time Japanese national champions. They competed internationally together, winning the bronze medal at the 1993 NHK Trophy and placing 15th at the 1994 World Championships. He said, "I stayed [in Japan] for two years, but I was alone in my apartment. I used to go to the Russian Embassy just to talk to people. I tried to learn some Japanese but it was very hard."

Tikhonov spent the next five years skating in various ice shows in the U.K. and Florida, including shows led by Tatiana Tarasova and Jayne Torvill and Christopher Dean. He started to miss competitive skating and when Maria Petrova's coach called, he agreed to compete with her. They teamed up in the summer of 1998. Petrova was a former World Junior champion with Anton Sikharulidze.

Petrova and Tikhonov won the World Championship in 2000. They placed 6th at the 2002 Winter Olympics and 5th at the 2006 Games. They won a silver medal at the 2005 Worlds, and a bronze in 2006.

Petrova and Tikhonov announced they would retire after the 2006 Worlds, but at the request of the Russian Skating Federation they later agreed to remain eligible for another year. During their final season, they finished 6th at the Grand Prix Final, and withdrew from the World Championships due to injury.

Petrova and Tikhonov trained in Saint Petersburg with Ludmila Velikova. After retiring from competition, they performed in ice shows, including Russian television projects.

Personal life 
Tikhonov was born to parents Vladimir and Larisa. In addition to skating together, Petrova and Tikhonov are also an off-ice couple. On 1 February 2010, she gave birth to their first child, a daughter named Polina. The family lives in Moscow region.

Tikhonov is godfather to Alexei Urmanov's twins.

Programs 
(with Petrova)

Competitive highlights

With Saifutdinova for the Soviet Union

With Kawasaki for Japan

With Petrova for Russia

References

External links 

 
 Official website of Maria Petrova and Alexei Tikhonov
 

1971 births
Living people
Russian male pair skaters
Olympic figure skaters of Russia
Figure skaters at the 2002 Winter Olympics
Figure skaters at the 2006 Winter Olympics
Japanese male pair skaters
Soviet male pair skaters
Russian expatriates in Japan
Sportspeople from Samara, Russia
World Figure Skating Championships medalists
European Figure Skating Championships medalists
World Junior Figure Skating Championships medalists
Goodwill Games medalists in figure skating
Season-end world number one figure skaters
Competitors at the 2001 Goodwill Games